Haltlose personality disorder was a type of personality disorder diagnosis largely used in German-, Russian- and French-speaking countries. The German word  haltlose refers to being "unstable" (literally: "without footing"), and in English-speaking countries the diagnosis was sometimes referred to as "the unstable psychopath" (although it was little known even among experts in psychiatry).

In the early twentieth century, haltlose personality disorder was described by Emil Kraepelin and Gustav Aschaffenburg. In 1905, Kraepelin first used the term to describe individuals possessing psychopathic traits built upon short-sighted selfishness and irresponsible hedonism, combined with an inability to anchor one's identity to a future or past. By 1913, he had characterized the symptomatology as stemming from a lack of inhibition. Haltlose was also characterized as a psychopathy with an "absence of intent or lack of will".  The diagnosis was recognized by Karl Jaspers, and by Eugen and Manfred Bleuler, among others.

In 1933, it was argued that significant social restraints needed to be imposed on the lives of people diagnosed with haltlose personality disorder, including "constant guardianship in an organized environment under the pressure of a harsh lifestyle, or in the hands of a person with a strong will who does not let him out of his sight". In 1936, it was claimed that – along with other "hyperthymics" – haltlose personalities constituted "the main component of serious crime". Haltlose came to be studied as a type of psychopathy relevant to criminology, as people with the diagnosis were viewed as becoming "very easily involved in criminality" and predisposed to aggression or homicide.

Haltlose personality disorder was viewed as difficult to identify due to high levels of conformity. Contrasting traits were noted of pronounced suggestibility and "abnormal rigidity and intransigence and firmness". As recently as 1978, a claim was made that a diagnosis of haltlose personality disorder carried one of the most unfavorable prognoses among the different types of psychopathies recognized at the time.

Regarding recent medical classifications, the term "haltlose personality disorder" was mentioned  in ICD-10 under "other specific personality disorders", and in DSM-III under "other personality disorders", but the term was not described or discussed in either classification (separately, it was claimed that the diagnosis describes a combination of frontal lobe syndrome, sociopathic and histrionic personality traits). It is no longer mentioned in DSM-4, DSM-5 or ICD-11.

Etymology and criticism
 is a German word that contextually refers to a floundering, aimless, irresponsible lifestyle, and the diagnosis is named  using the feminine or plural nominalization of the word. They were commonly clinically termed an "unstable psychopath", which is differentiated from emotionally unstable personality disorder (the ICD-10 equivalent of borderline personality disorder). It was remarked in early studies that England, the United States and northern European countries did not use the same typology, not distinguishing between those psychopaths who were unstable and those who were "Unstable Psychopaths".

It has been dubbed a part of "German-speaking psychiatry". The term "Haltlose" is more common in the study of psychiatry, while "Willenlose" is preferred in sociology. Some like Karl Birnbaum prefer the term "Haltlose", while others like Kurt Schneider prefer "Willenlos" shifting focus off their lack of self-control and opposed to the moralist tones of those like Birnbaum who had described the Haltlose as unable to grasp "important ideal values such as honor and morality, duty and responsibility, as well as material ones such as prosperity and health". In 1928, Eugen Kahn argued Willenlose was a misnomer, as the patients demonstrated plenty of "will" and simply lacked the ability to translate it into action.

Historically, researchers such as Schneider argued that instability is the symptom, whereas lack of volition is the underlying cause. It is not included in the Diagnostic and Statistical Manual of Mental Disorders, possibly due to a modern belief that the concept of volition is outdated and overshadowed by the concepts of motivation and arousal or drive.

In 1963, Karl Jaspers defined the term as "those who have no willpower at all, the drifters, simply echoing any influence that impinges on them". However, in 1976, the Government of Canada listed the alternate term "Unstable drifter" in a psychiatric criminology context as a problematic term for which they could not readily offer a French translation in accordance with their bilingualism laws. Similar issues have arisen trying to translate it to other languages, including Turkish.

In the early 20th century, Aschaffenburg distanced himself from accusations that the diagnosis was intended to protect criminals from punishment, emphasizing instead that those with Haltlose personality disorder "generally cannot be exculpated".

Dr. Friedrich Stumpfl cautioned against what he saw as a trend of diagnosing haltlose personality disorder without investigating comorbidities that may be even more pronounced. In condemning the idea of personality disorders generally, Joachim-Ernst Meyer suggested in 1976 that Schneider's early description of the Haltlose personality disorder, as a lack of determination in aspects of life including parenting, could just as easily be described as an example of a neurosis rather than a psychopathy if studied only by its aetiology rather than its symptoms, and used it as an example of the nature versus nurture debate that surrounded all personality disorders. Critics ceded that the term "Haltlose" remained of value in educational and therapeutic contexts, while suggesting future collaboration between psychiatric research and sociologists would allow further definition.

It has been criticized as a "diagnosis of convenience [that] avoids all further deliberations about a psychopathic personality". Dr. DM Svrakic and Dr. M Divac-Jovanovic suggested the ICD-10 explanations of Haltlose, Immature and Psychoneurotic personality disorders appeared "dubious", and sociologist James Cosgrave found psychiatric use to represent a "fringe figure". A graduate student at Bochumer Stadt & Studierendenzeitung condemned the historical diagnosis from an LGBT perspective, opining that "incredibly oppressive language" had been used by the psychiatrists studying it such as "pathological femininity".

It may be that the evolution of test-batteries have minimized diagnoses of Haltlosen, differentiating it from some newer models in psychiatry.

Theorised causes

Fear 
One proposed explanation for the development of haltlose personality trait was fear. After discovering a guilty conscience due to some act or omission they have committed, "they then live under constant fear of the consequences of their action or inaction, fear of something bad that might strike them" in stark opposition to their apparent carelessness or hyperthymic temperament, which is itself frequently a subconscious reaction to overwhelming fear. Given their tendency to "exaggerate, to embroider their narratives, to picture themselves in ideal situations, to invent stories", this fear then manifests as being "apt to blame others for their offences, frequently seeking to avoid responsibility for their actions". They do not hold themselves responsible for their failed life, instead identifying as an ill-treated martyr.

They were characterized as Dégénérés supérieurs, demonstrating normal or heightened intellect but degraded moral standards. Of the ten types of psychopaths defined by Schneider, only the Gemütlose (compassionless) and the Haltlose "had high levels of criminal behavior" without external influence, and thus made up the minority of psychopaths who are "virtually doomed to commit crimes" by virtue only of their own constitution. Frequently changing their determined goals, a haltlose psychopath is "constantly looking for an external hold, it doesn't really matter whether they join occult or fascist movements". The ability to moderate external influence was considered one of three characteristics necessary to form an overall personality, thus leaving Haltlose patients without a functional personality of their own. A study of those with haltlose personality disorder concludes "In all of those cases, the result was a continuous social decline that ended in asocial-parasitic existence or an antisocial-criminal life".

Physiological 
Described as bearing a "pronounced heredity burden", the propensity for Haltlose has also been suggested to be passed only through the maternal genes. Tending to offer "primitive reactions" and "poor and immature judgement", they were noted to display an absolute lack of purpose in their lives "except for the simple biological need to continue living".

Gustav von Bergmann, a specialist in internal medicine rather than psychiatry, wrote in 1936 that Haltlose personality disorder was entirely biological rather than fostered through psychological experiences. Indeed, Dr. Hans Luxenburger proposed in 1939 that a toxin in the metabolism, when present with Haltlose personality disorder, might be responsible for asthenic difficulties such as shortness of breath, nausea, and cluster headaches. Dr. E.H. Hughes noted that two-thirds of Huntington's disease patients had previously been diagnosed as Haltlose or Gemütlose psychopaths.

A study in 1949 of different psychopathies under examination by electroencephalography recordings showed that borderline personalities and haltlose personalities had increased levels of dysrhythmia, whereas other subtypes of psychopathy did not show variation. An individual in 1931 was noted as having initially improved but relapsed "because of encephalitis". As with other personality disorders, a 1923 article suggests it can also be acquired through encephalitis. In 2006, an Essex warehouse employee who sustained head injuries was awarded £3 million compensation on the basis it had caused him to develop Haltlose personality disorder, seeking out prostitutes and pornography which destroyed his marriage.

Dr. W. Blankenburg posited in 1968 that those with haltlose personality disorder exhibited less categorical orientation than those patients who were simply unstable. By 1962, lobotomies were being tested as a possible means to limit the chaotic thinking of the Haltlose personality.

Those with haltlose personality disorder demonstrate similarities to hysteroid dysphoria. In 1928, it was proposed that fantasy prone personality was likely a subset of Haltlose personalities, experiencing maladaptive daydreaming and absorption.

The eugenicist Verners Kraulis of the University of Latvia noted it was frequently comorbid with Histrionic personality disorder.

Symptoms
According to 1968 research, haltlose personality disorder is frequently comorbid with other mental health diagnoses, and rarely appears isolated on its own. Hans Heinze focused on his belief that Haltlose ultimately stemmed from a sense of inferiority, while Kramer held there was a battling inferiority complex and superiority complex.

The Haltlose were said to have a dynamic instinctual drive to "cling" to others, to avoid a horrible loneliness they fear – but they will always represent a "lurking danger" because they were unable to actually maintain the necessary relationship and were in a class with the "forever abandoned". According to 1926 research, they view all interaction as a means of winning "indulgence from some people, help from other people".

One early study indicated that 7.5% of psychopaths were Haltlose, and Kraepelin estimated that his own practice determined fewer than 20% of psychopaths he saw were Haltlose. However, later studies, after differentiating out newer diagnoses, have suggested that it may be fewer than 1% of psychopaths who are truly Haltlose.

Described in 1922 as both "moody" and "passive", they quickly switch from over-confidence in victory to sullen defiance.

Their emotional lability means they alternate between projecting an optimistic and competent image claiming they are "destined to do great things", and a more honest cynicism and depression. Research in 1925 indicates they display "great emotional irritability, which may result in violent loss of temper...and interpret every limitation as an undeserved insult" and have a "pronounced lust for argument". The symptoms are considered to worsen if patients are granted greater independence "in the home and in their work".

Their self schema only encompasses the immediate present. They are described as "living in a random location and moment". A common pitfall in therapy is that they proved in 1917 to be "very superficial, they easily acquire knowledge but do not apply it in any way and soon forget it".

Those with HLPD display "a number of endearing qualities, charming with an apparent emotional warmth, but also an enhanced suggestibility and a superficiality of affect", which can lead to unrealistic optimism. and "wandering through life without ever taking firm root". They are also noted as "absolutely indifferent to others...likes to live for [their] pleasure today, does not make plans not only for the future but even for tomorrow, studying and working are not for them". Persons with HLPD typically lack any deep knowledge, and "look for easy life and pleasures". They have been described as "conquerers with an appearance of emotional warmth".

Persons with HLPD were noted as struggling with hypochondria in 1907.

Kraepelin said they were "apt to take senseless journeys, perhaps even becoming vagabonds". Kraepelin argued only lifelong wanderlust was tied to Haltlose, whereas Kahn argued that the Haltlose often lost their wanderlust as they aged and preferred to settle into mediocrity. Some make their fortune, but the disappearance of less fortunate travelers is not mentioned by their families who considered them to have been burdensome.

To early twentieth-century researchers, they appeared amiable, well-spoken, self-confident and to be making strong efforts to improve their weaknesses, thus making a misleading first impression and endearing themselves to superiors. The lack of a sense of identity, or internal support, was thought to a lack of resistance to both external and internal impulses in 1927. Their "gradual deterioration in the swamp of neediness and immorality" still does not make a lasting impression on the patients. Thus Haltlose patients who recognize their shortcomings were thought to possibly be overwhelmed by a subconscious fear about participating in the world without restraints in a 1924 account. Similarly, researchers in the early twentieth-century believed that the inauthenticity of their projected self and superficiality of knowledge means that when "someone who is really superior to [them]", after a period of stiffly asserting themselves hoping to avoid submission, will ultimately and without explanation fully embrace the position of the other.

Pathological lying is closely linked to Haltlose personality disorder, with Arthur Kielholz noting "They lie like children...this activity always remains just a game which never satisfies them and leaves them with a guilty conscious because neither the super ego nor the Id get their due... Since they are offering such a daydream as a gift, they consider themselves entitled to extract some symbolic gift in return through fraud or theft". Adler maintained "Memory is usually poor and untrustworthy... often they seem to have no realization of the truth", while Homburger felt they held "no sense of objectivity, no need for truth or consistency".

According to early accounts, choices are made, often in mirroring others around them, but "do not leave even a passing imprint on the person's identity". Thus, they can "behave properly for a while under good leadership", and are not to be trusted in leadership positions themselves. Gannushkin noted they must be urged, scolded or encouraged "with a stick, as they say". They demonstrate poor mood control and "react quickly to immediate circumstances" since "mood variation can be extreme and fluctuate wildly", which led to the denotation "unstable psychopath".

They have been described as "cold-blooded", but must be differentiated from dependent personality disorder, as the two can appear similar, due to the artifice of the Haltlose patient, despite having starkly opposing foundations. Persons with Dependent Personality Disorder are defined by a tendency to embarrassment, and submissiveness which are not genuine facets of those with Haltlose even if they mimic such. Haltlose was thus deemed the "more troublesome" personality in 1955.

Consumption 
People with haltlose personality disorder were found to struggle with alcoholism, and identify with antisocial personality disorder. Kraepelin, in noting "an increased risk of criminal behavior", estimated that 64% of men and 20% of women with Haltlose descended into alcoholism in the early twentieth century. The high observed correlation between haltlose personality disorder and alcoholism led to clinical researchers at the time using "haltlose" as a grouping when separating subjects by disposition.

Research in 1915 noted an increased propensity for lavish spending, and overconsumption of coffee, tea and medication.

Sexual 
One 1954 study suggested female Haltlose patients may experience "manic excitement" during their menses. According to 1949 research, they have a higher rate of homosexuality, and 1939 evidence suggested that masturbation is more prevalent in Haltlose and Gemütlose (compassionless) psychopaths than in other disorders, and Haltlose erethics leave them "usually very sexually excited" and seeking out "atypical, irregular and unusual" debauchery whether in brothels, adultery or destroying marriages.

Childhood origins, and later role of family

It has been proposed that haltlose personality disorder may arise from "traumatization through maternal indolence" or institutionalization in early life, although without definite conclusion. It may present in childhood simply as a hypomanic reaction to the loss of a parent or incest object. They often display a fear of abandonment that appeared in childhood, a common BPD symptom. Male haltlose personalities may come out of families with a pampering, over-protective and domineering mother with a weak father. Homburger noted the "childhood and youth of the Haltlose are extraordinarily sad". It is possible, but rare, for Haltlose personalities to develop within healthy family structures.

Gerhardt Nissen referenced the possibility of intrauterine factors in the shaping of anti-social behaviors in Haltlose psychopaths, while noting the concept of psychopathy had been so weakened in modern psychopathology as to be indistinguishable from other conditions. Others have suggested there is a strong heredity correlation, as the parents often also display Haltlose personality disorder, especially the mother. Raising a Haltlose child can, in some cases, destroy the family structure by forcing relatives to take opposing positions, provoking disagreement and creating an atmosphere of bitterness and dejection. They have been clinically described as disappointments to their families, and are unable to feel actual love for their parents and are indifferent to the hardships of relatives – since all relationships are seen only as potential means towards acquiring pleasure.

Care must be taken in making Haltlose diagnoses of children, since "the traits of instability of purpose, lack of forethought, suggestibility, egoism and superficiality of affect...are to some extent normal in childhood". Children with Haltlose personality disorder demonstrate a marked milieu dependency, which may be a cause rather than effect of the Haltlose. It is of great importance that only children with Haltlose have peers and friends to surround themselves to try and learn associations and behaviors. They often become sexually active at a young age but delayed sexual maturity, and as adults retain a psychophysical infantilism. Regressive addictions amongst Haltlose psychopaths typically are infantile, and seek to replace the lost "dual union" arising from their parents' rejection, and later morph into a focus on subjects including vengeance or sado-masochism.

The age at which parents or professionals exhibited concern about psychopathy ranged; rarely even at a preschool age. Haltlose children confusingly tend to appear very strong-willed and ambitious, it is only as they age and the lack of perseverance becomes manifest that caretakers become puzzled by their "naughtiness" as it contradicts what had earlier appeared. This arises principally due to their rigid demands for short-term wishes being mistakenly interpreted as having a fixed purpose and persistence.Some patients later shown to be Haltlose, had shown neuropathic traits in childhood such as bedwetting and stuttering. They were also more likely to run away from their home, begin drinking before the socially acceptable age, and were afraid of punishment. Although struggling to make friends in young childhood, they find it easier as they age.

Kraepelin contended the disorder was "based on a biological predisposition" but also affected by factors such as childrearing practises, social position and state of the parental home. His analysis showed that 49% of diagnosed Haltlose had obvious parental issues such as alcoholism or personality disorders. A 1944 study of children produced by incest by Dr. Alfred Aschenbrenner found a high rate of Haltlose personality disorder, which he suggested might be explained as inherited from overly suggestive mothers. It is possible, although difficult, to diagnose from the age of five and presents one of the stronger psychiatric difficulties if present at such young age. It may be possible to prevent social failure "through welfare measures" akin to early intervention. Italian courts stressed mimicry of positive role models as a means to combat Haltlose youth who had fallen afoul of the law.

Schooling
Haltlose can cause educational difficulties, and if parents do not understand the peculiarities of their Haltlose child, they may try to through good intentions to force the child into an educational regimen inappropriate for them, which then creates a feeling of isolation in the child which grows into a rebellious tendencies, "which turns out to be disastrous for further development". Students with Haltlose personalities may prefer the arts over the sciences, since the former does not require a consistent sense of truth and entails less disciplined study. Given their inability to anchor a self-schema and tendency to play-act roles, the theatre and film have great attraction and influence over them.

With proper leadership and controls from teachers, they are able to become "model pupils" in terms of behavior, although Schneider opined that it was worthless to educate an inability to learn from mistakes prevented actual education, and bemoaned that the late onset of anti-social behaviors kept the Haltlose in school when they might otherwise be removed. Walter Moos believed that Haltlose personality disorder and hyperthymia had shown itself to be contagious in rare cases, wherein classmates developed the same disorder from interaction with patients. Homburger argued for removing a Haltlose child from their family of origin as soon as the disorder was confirmed, to resettle in a rural educational centre.

Adolescence, young adulthood and efforts to intervene

When required to live independently, they "soon lose interest, become distracted and absent-minded, and commit gross errors and negligence". Ruth von der Leyen noted that "every care provider, teacher and doctor knows the Haltlose Psychopath from their practice", and remarked that caring for such a patient was made more difficult because of the need to lecture and intervene to enlist the psychopath's cooperation in short-term improvements, despite being aware the psychiatric reports have determined such efforts are ultimately useless but should be practised regardless.

The tendency to accumulate debts while seeking pleasure or escaping responsibility is often the attributed cause for their descent into crime, although Kramer noted those who displayed "extreme dexterity, sufficient talent for imagination, and a tendency towards dishonesty" were able to find alternative sources of income without necessarily becoming criminal, although warned that "again and again, their debts have to be paid until the parents no longer can, or want to, do this and leave them to their selves".

Gannushkin noted "Such people involuntarily evoke sympathy and a desire to help them, but the assistance rendered to them rarely lasts, so it is worth abandoning such people for a short while". The wasted good intentions resulted in the summary "probably the most important function of the psychiatrist when dealing with these patients is to protect their relatives and friends from ruining themselves in hopeless attempts at reclamation. With most of these patients a time comes when the relatives will be best advised...to allow the patient to go to prison, or otherwise suffer unsheltered the consequences of his deeds."

By contrast, others have advanced the "rather optimistic" belief that "a suitable [spouse]" or similar "strong-willed" relative could drastically improve the outcome of Haltlosen patients. This was echoed by Andrey Yevgenyevich Lichko who, while preferring the term "accentuation of character" to describe the psychopathy rather than "personality disorder", noted "if they fall into the hands of a person with a strong will, for example a wife or husband, they can they live quite happily...but the guardianship must be permanent."

Criminology

While some Haltlose have risen to the level of dangerous offenders multiple times over, it is more frequent that they attract attention early from their "vagabond" nature.

Heinrich Schulte, a wartime medical judge and consulting psychiatrist for the military, continued advocating for the sterilization of Haltlose and other "Schwachsinnigen" after the war's end. In 1979, the Neue Anthropologie publication referred to a need to sterilize those like alcoholics, "who are often Haltlose psychopaths", from bearing children, to reduce crime.

Although Kraepelin believed those with Haltlose personality disorder represented the antithesis of morality, there is not necessarily a tendency towards deliberate amorality among the demographic despite its frequent criminal violations since they may lack the ability to premeditate. But their demonstrated lack of self-control is "especially manifested in the sphere of morality".

In 1935, it was estimated that 58% of recidivist criminals were diagnosed with Haltlose personality disorder, higher than any other personality disorder. Haltlose and Histrionic were the most common personality disorders found in female juvenile delinquents by forensic psychologists in Russia in the year 2000.

Domestic violence, incest and molestation of children

Although they enter relationships easily, Andrey Yevgenyevich Lichko contends they are not capable of actual loyalty or selfless love, and sex is treated as a form of entertainment rather than intimacy. They are therefore described as acting as "family tyrants".

Although they may not qualify as true pedophiles, Haltlose personalities demonstrate an increased risk of sexually molesting children, since other potential victims would require the realization of greater planning, but children are suggestible and easily overwhelmed.

A 1967 German study had suggested over 90% of adult-child incest offenders were diagnosed with Haltlose Personality Disorder. Female patients may also live vicariously through encouraging and directing the sexual lives of their daughters.

Drunk driving, hit-and-run
Some Haltlose personalities are drawn towards dangerous driving habits "as a source of almost hedonist pleasure". In 1949 the Automobil Revue proposed that additional tests should be necessary for Haltlose personalities to obtain a driver's license. They have been known to steal cars to joyride at high speeds if they are not otherwise able to find satisfy their urge.

The American Journal of Psychiatry published a study of hit and run drivers in 1941, which showed 40% of drivers who fled the scene of a traffic accident tested positive for Haltlose personality disorder. This was consistent with the earlier finding that Haltlose personalities were among the most likely to attempt to flee if caught in commission of any crime.

Suicidality and murder-suicide
Research in the early twentieth century on suicidality among the Haltlose indicated several things: they chafe at the notion of any religion as it introduces unwanted inhibitions, especially against parasuicidal demonstrations; women Haltlose most frequently indicated suicidality was based upon fear of punishment or reproach, as well as the "excitement" of being institutionalized; and although frequently planning or attempting suicide, including through suicide pacts or murder suicide, Haltlose typically do not succeed since they lacked courage and were easily distracted.

Institutionalization
Haltlose patients respond very well to institutionalization where their influences can be controlled, becoming "model inmates" of sanitariums even within hours of first arriving despite a chaotic life outside of the regimen, "but if you leave them, through good intentions, to their own devices – they don't last long before collapsing their current state and being seduced back onto the wrong track". Schneider recommended warning them "through punishing them" as it was the only control on their action. Bleuler said the court system needed to understand such persons were in "urgent need of inhibitions".

Pyotr Gannushkin noted they joined military service due to peer pressure but given the lack of alcohol and stern, hard work required of them were able to function without their normal impairment. A 1942 study of the Wehrmacht found that only Haltlose and Schizoid were not measurable among soldiers despite their presence in the civilian population. A 1976 Soviet naval study came to similar conclusions.

Roth and Slater concluded "the treatment of such a personality is almost hopeless under the present ordering of society. Any treatment would...present difficulties...beyond the powers of these patients. The prospects of psychotherapy are forlorn and the best that can be obtained will be reached through social control."

Some researchers suggest their moods and insufficient motivation will lead them to "vague feelings of fear and calamity...turning every little thing into big things, excitement, misinterpreting every harmless word, criticizing everything and commiting hostile acts", and in some cases they look back with hindsight and regret the injustices they did. However Kramer held that when caught in wrongdoing, "we find them contrite, self-accusing and assuring that they will improve – but on closer inspection it is feigned and not sincere".

Upon being confronted with their misdeeds, the Haltlose respond "with more or less superficial reasons to excuse them, they claim that their parents treated them incorrectly, that they were the victim of adverse circumstances, seduced by other people and misled. Other Haltlose, especially those with a strong intellect, make up a theoretical schema that would justify their actions."

External links
 
Kielholz, Arthur, Internationale Zeitschrift für Psychoanalyse XIX 1933 Heft 4, "Weh'dem der lugt! Beitrag zum problem der pseudologia phantastica", an article on pathological lying in the Haltlose patients Max Specke, a Swiss charlatan with a penchant for melodramatic flair and Emil Schuldling, a habitual criminal with childhood sexual perversions
Story of Robert Wenger, who was diagnosed Haltlose and spent 54 years between institutions and prison for minor crimes until the documentary series Quer exposed his case, leading to an apology from politician Samuel Bhend in 1999.
Karl Hager , a habitual criminal diagnosed Haltlose who was frequently jailed for homosexual acts and was ultimately killed in Sachsenhausen concentration camp 
Biography of a man diagnosed Haltlose in 1936 

Article referencing Hermann Lederman, discharged from the Wehrmacht in 1940 having been diagnosed with Haltlose personality disorder and sent to Wehrmachtgefängnis Torgau
Article about Karl Sieger, a chronic drunkard diagnosed with Haltlose personality disorder in 1936 by Dr. Ferdinand Rechberg of Konstanz
Thomas Leveritt's novel The Exchange-Rate Between Love and Money contains a character, Frito, who has Haltlose personality disorder

References 

Anti-social behaviour
Forensic psychiatry
Mental health in Germany
Personality disorders
Free will
Criminology